
Year 416 (CDXVI) was a leap year starting on Saturday (link will display the full calendar) of the Julian calendar. At the time, it was known as the Year of the Consulship of Theodosius and Palladius (or, less frequently, year 1169 Ab urbe condita). The denomination 416 for this year has been used since the early medieval period, when the Anno Domini calendar era became the prevalent method in Europe for naming years.

Events 
 By place 

 Roman Empire 
 Priscus Attalus, Roman usurper, is forced to participate in a triumph celebrated by Emperor Honorius, in the streets of Rome. After the festivities, he is exiled to the Lipari Islands (north of Sicily).

 Europe 
 The Visigoths continue their invasion of Hispania, and take control of Tarraconensis. King Wallia occupies the gold mines at Las Médulas, and forces Jewish citizens to convert to Christianity.

 Asia 
 Reports of the eruption of Krakatoa are recorded in a Javanese historical chronicle called the Book of Kings.

 By topic 

 Arts and Sciences 
 Rutilius Claudius Namatianus begins his journey home from Rome to Gaul. This becomes the subject of his unfinished poem, De Reditu Suo.

Births

Deaths 
 Huiyuan, Buddhist teacher and founder of the Donglin Temple (b. 334)
 Lü Long, last emperor of the Chinese Di state Later Liang  
 Yao Xing, emperor of the Qiang state Later Qin (b. 366)

References